Michael Finbarr Cronin (26 September 1902 – 1982) was an Irish hurler who played as a left corner-back at senior level for the Tipperary county team. 

Cronin made his first appearance for the team during the 1927 championship and was a regular member of the starting fifteen until his retirement after the 1936 championship. During that time he won one All-Ireland medal, one Munster medal and one National League medal. 

At club level Cronin had a lengthy career with Lorrha–Dorrha.

References

1902 births
1982 deaths
All-Ireland Senior Hurling Championship winners
Alumni of De La Salle Teacher Training College, Waterford
Heads of schools in Ireland
Lorrha-Dorrha hurlers
Munster inter-provincial hurlers
Tipperary inter-county hurlers